Villa Maria, is a village in Kalungu District in the Central Region of Uganda.

Location
The geographical coordinates of Villa Maria are 00 13 42S, 31 44 50E (Latitude:-0.228345; Longitude:31.747230).

Landmarks
The landmarks within the town limits or near the town include:

 offices of Villa Maria Village Council
 Villa Maria Catholic Cathedral
 Villa Maria Hospital
 Villa Maria central market
 campus of Bukalasa Minor Seminary
 campus of Katigondo Major Seminary
 southern end of Sembabule–Villa Maria Road

See also
 Kalungu

References

External links
Inside 100 years of Priesthood
Website of Uganda National Roads Authority

Kalungu District
Populated places in Central Region, Uganda
Cities in the Great Rift Valley